A Maid of the Silver Sea is a novel by the British writer John Oxenham, which was first published in 1910.

Film adaptation
In 1922 the novel was turned into a silent film A Maid of the Silver Sea directed by and starring Guy Newall alongside his wife Ivy Duke.

References

Bibliography
 Goble, Alan. The Complete Index to Literary Sources in Film. Walter de Gruyter, 1999.

1910 British novels
British novels adapted into films